Megumi is a Japanese feminine name.

Megumi may also refer to:

 Megumi (actress) (born 1981), Japanese actress
 Megumi (manga), a manga about a Japanese girl who was abducted by North Korean spies, later adapted into anime 
 Megumi-Toons, an autobiographical manga series written by voice actress Megumi Hayashibara
 3774 Megumi, a minor planet